The following list contains dates beyond October 2001 involving the September 11 attacks.

2001

November

Thursday, November 1, 2001
Afternoon: Deputy Mayor Anthony P. Coles meets with the two firefighter union leaders, Fire Capt. Peter L. Gorman, president of the Uniformed Fire Officers Association and Kevin E. Gallagher, president of the Uniformed Firefighters Association, at New York City Hall to discuss the firefighters' unhappiness with the October 31 decision.
Night: The unions fax a notice to the New York firefighters to hold a demonstration on Friday morning.
Near midnight: Rudy Giuliani calls from Yankee Stadium at the World Series to Fire Commissioner Thomas Von Essen about talk of a protest.

Friday, November 2, 2001
Approximately 10:30 a.m. EST Emotions spill over into violence at a two-hour protest by several hundred to a thousand firefighters near City Hall, beginning at West and Chambers Streets, to protest Giuliani's October 31st ruling to reduce the number of firefighters permitted at the World Trade Center site from 64 to 25. After firefighter Mike Heffernan, brother of John Heffernan, retired fire captain Bill Butler, father of Tommy Butler, and Kevin E. Gallagher, the president of the Uniformed Firefighters Association, speak, the assembled protesters push aside a barricade and begin walking south down West Street. At the next barricade the police move in, punches are thrown, and firefighters handcuffed. Both sides shout for understanding, and the conflict quickly subsides. The firefighters then march out to the applause of construction workers, the protest breaking up around 12:30 p.m.
 12 firefighters (including four ranking fire officers and one fire marshal) are arrested and taken to the 28th Precinct station house in central Harlem. 5 police officers are injured, two with black eyes and facial trauma, three with neck, shoulder and back injuries.

Monday, November 12, 2001 

 Approximately 9:16 a.m. EST - American Airlines Flight 587 crashes in Belle Harbor, Queens, New York. 265 people, 260 on the plane, are killed. Originally thought to be terrorism and claimed as a victory by Al-Qaeda, an NTSB investigation finds the cause of the crash to be pilot error as a result of misuse of the aircraft's rudder; the Airbus A300 had taken off moments after a Japan Airlines Boeing 747 had taken off from the same runway at John F. Kennedy International Airport, which caused massive air turbulence. In an attempt to fight against the turbulence, the first officer repeatedly and aggressively moved the plane's rudder from extreme left to right, inflicting enough metal fatigue to cause the entire vertical stabiliser to shear off, rendering the aircraft uncontrollable. As a precaution, the Empire State Building and UN headquarters are evacuated. Months later, Abderraouf Jdey is named by Al-Qaeda operative Mohammed Jabarah as the person responsible for the disaster, but this cannot be confirmed by any source investigating the crash.

Monday, November 19, 2001 

 The Transportation Security Administration, also known as TSA, is formed.

December 
Morning and television sitcoms broadcast dedications.

Sunday, December 16, 2001 
 The last remnants of the North Tower's facade are cut down.

Thursday, December 20, 2001 
 The last fires at the World Trade Center site are extinguished.

2002

February

Sunday, February 3, 2002 
 Super Bowl XXXVI is held in New Orleans, becoming the first sporting event designated by the Department of Homeland Security as a National Special Security Event. The pregame ceremonies and the halftime show honor the victims of 9/11.

Friday, February 8, 2002 
 At the opening ceremony of the 2002 Winter Olympics in Salt Lake City, a tattered American flag recovered from the World Trade Center site is carried into the stadium by American athletes, members of the Port Authority police, and members of the New York City police and fire departments.

March

Monday, March 11, 2002 

 Six months after the attack, numerous ceremonies of remembrance take place.
 Huffman Aviation receives a letter from the Immigration and Naturalization Service saying that Mohamed Atta and Marwan al-Shehhi had been approved for student visas to study there.
 The Tribute in Light project begins. The project goes for a month and is re-launched on September 11, 2003, to mark the second anniversary of the attack. The Tribute in Light is now done every year on September 11.

Tuesday, March 12, 2002 

 The remains of at least 11 firefighters and several civilians are found when recovery workers reach the site of what had been the south tower lobby.

May

Tuesday, May 28, 2002 

 The last steel beam standing at the World Trade Center site is cut down and placed on a flatbed truck in a quiet ceremony.

June

Tuesday, June 4, 2002 

 As a sign of saying thank you for the support Britain gave in the days immediately following the attacks, New York City lit the Empire State Building in purple and gold to mark the Golden Jubilee celebrations for Queen Elizabeth II.

August

Monday, August 19, 2002 

 The New York City Medical Examiner releases an updated list of World Trade Center casualties. There were 2,819 killed or missing, 4 less than the Police Department list which had been the best official tally publicly released. One name removed was that of a woman who had been listed under both her maiden and married names. The other three were of people reported missing once by people who had since not been in contact with New York City officials.

Tuesday, August 20, 2002 

 Police determine that Albert John Vaughan, 45, and George V. Sims, 46, missing and presumed dead, are alive. Vaughan has been a patient at the Rockland Psychiatric Center in Orangeburg, N.Y. Sims is a patient with amnesia and schizophrenia at a Manhattan hospital.

Tuesday, August 27, 2002 

 The Newark Star-Ledger reports that George V. Sims is alive. By this point at least 7 people on the August 19 list have been found; there are now 2,812 killed or presumed dead.

September

Saturday, September 7, 2002
The New York City Medical Examiner releases a new list of World Trade Center deaths. The new list has 22 fewer names than the previous one. The death toll now stands at 2801, including the dead on the airplanes but not the 10 hijackers.

Tuesday, September 10, 2002
The United States goes on high security alert as anniversary approaches. Other countries such as Great Britain go on similar alert status.
Al-Jazeera releases videotapes of four of the September 11 hijackers - Ahmed al-Nami, Hamza al-Ghamdi, Ahmed al-Ghamdi and Wail al-Shehri. All four are seen talking to the camera.

Wednesday, September 11, 2002
Remembrance services are held throughout the USA.
The ceremony at New York City, broadcast throughout the world, falls an hour behind schedule, but is well attended. The ceremony included the reading out of the names of all the persons who died there (on both the planes and the World Trade Center) and the recitals of American historical speeches such as the Gettysburg Address. Moments of silence are observed at 8:46 a.m. and 9:03 a.m., the moments when the two planes struck the two towers, and church bells ring at 9:59 a.m. and 10:29 a.m., the moment at which the South and North towers respectively collapsed. Foreign dignitaries gather in Battery Park for the lighting of the eternal flame at sunset. President George W. Bush addresses the nation from Ellis Island an hour and a half after the lighting of the eternal flame.
 The private ceremony at The Pentagon is also well-attended, and included the President amongst its participants. A prayer is said at the end that referred to Todd Beamer's "Let's roll" remark.
 The public ceremony at Shanksville also had a large turnout. It included two flybys and a release of doves. President George W. Bush attends a private follow up service for the families of Flight 93's victims in the afternoon.
 In Karachi, wanted terrorist Ramzi bin al-Shibh (also known as Ramzi Omar) is among five alleged terrorists captured by Pakistani authorities at a Defence Housing Authority estate. Bin al-Shibh is wanted by US authorities in relation to the September 11 attacks. His capture does not become public knowledge for two days, but photographs featuring him being led away blindfolded are published on the day.

Thursday, September 26, 2002

 The Lower Manhattan Development Corporation selects six new design teams from around the globe for the World Trade Center site.

Friday, September 27, 2002

 The City of New York renames 81 streets, 79 in Staten Island and two in Manhattan, after victims.
 The New York Department of Environmental Conservation announces that construction equipment at the World Trade Center site will have to use ultra-low sulfur diesel fuel.

2003

February

Wednesday, February 26, 2003

 Daniel Libeskind's design is announced as the winner and future occupant of the former World Trade Center site. The design includes an office building and a Wedge of Light which will honor the victims of the terrorist attacks by shutting down its lights between 8:46AM and 10:28AM EST every September 11. It will also use the WTC's foundations.

March

March 1, 2003 

 Khalid Sheikh Mohammed, the mastermind of the attacks, is captured by the Pakistani ISI in Rawalpindi and handed into U.S. custody.

2004

July

Sunday, July 4, 2004, 

 The cornerstone of One World Trade Center, a building designed to replace the Twin Towers, is laid.

Thursday, July 22, 2004

The 9/11 Commission Report is published.

2006

April

Thursday, April 27, 2006, 
The construction of One World Trade Center commences.

May

Tuesday, May 23, 2006 
The new 7 World Trade Center opens in New York City.

September

Monday, September 11, 2006
Between the hours of 8:30 a.m. and midnight on September 11, 2006, on CNN, viewers could watch CNN footage of the attacks, as it happened as it was broadcast on that day. At 8:49 a.m. ET, during American Morning, CNN rebroadcast the first minute of its coverage, as it was the moment it broke the news.

MSNBC broadcasts national NBC News coverage from 8:52 to 12:00 ET, branding it as a "Living History Event". They would do it again annually since then.

2008

Monday, February 11, 2008 
The United States announces charges for Khalid Sheikh Mohammed and four other conspirators, and that it will seek the death penalty in the case.

Sunday, April 20, 2008
Pope Benedict XVI made a visit to the World Trade Center Site during his visit to the United States. He is the first pope to visit the site since the attacks.

Saturday, May 17, 2008 
One World Trade Center reaches ground level.

Thursday, September 11, 2008

George W. Bush dedicates the Pentagon Memorial to the public on the occasion of the seventh anniversary of the September 11 attacks.

2009

Friday, November 13, 2009 
U.S. Attorney General Eric Holder announces that Khalid Sheikh Mohammed's trial will be transferred from a military commission to the civilian U.S. District Court for the Southern District of New York.

2010

Wednesday, June 23, 2010 
District Judge Alvin Hellerstein approves a $700 million settlement between the World Trade Center Captive Insurance Company and 95 percent of plaintiffs for reimbursement of 9/11 first responders exposed to toxic dust at Ground Zero.

2011

Sunday, January 2, 2011 
President Barack Obama signs the James Zadroga 9/11 Health and Compensation Act creating the World Trade Center Health Program for 9/11 victims.

Tuesday, April 5, 2011 
Attorney General Holder transfers the KSM trial back to military jurisdiction.

Monday, May 2, 2011 
Osama bin Laden, the founder of the terrorist organization al-Qaeda who was responsible for the September 11 attacks, was killed by U.S. Navy SEALs in Abbottabad, Pakistan. The death of bin Laden was announced by the President of the United States Barack Obama in a nationwide address.

Sunday, September 11, 2011
Ceremonies are held across the United States and the world to mark the tenth anniversary of the attacks. The National September 11 Memorial at the World Trade Center site is dedicated in a ceremony attended by President Obama, former President Bush, their respective First Ladies, and several federal, state, and local government officials. One day earlier, the Flight 93 National Memorial in Shanksville, Pennsylvania was inaugurated in a ceremony attended by Vice President Joe Biden.

2012

Saturday, May 5, 2012 
Khalid Sheikh Mohammed and five other alleged conspirators of the September 11 attacks are arraigned by a U.S. military court presided by Colonel James L. Pohl.

Thursday, August 30, 2012 
Construction of 1 World Trade Center's main structure tops out at 104 floors.

Wednesday, December 19, 2012 
The Journal of the American Medical Association publishes an article indicating an increased risk of cancer from exposure to the 9/11 attacks.

2013

Friday, May 10, 2013 
Construction of the new One World Trade Center is completed with the installation of the spire at 1,776 feet, making it the tallest building in both the United States and the Western Hemisphere.

Wednesday, November 13, 2013 
The new 4 World Trade Center opens.

2014

May

Friday, May 2, 2014 
The U.S. Court of Appeals for the Second Circuit rules in a lawsuit from Cedar & Washington Associates that American Airlines Group Inc., United Continental Holdings, the Port Authority of New York & New Jersey, and Larry Silverstein are exempt from having to pay for environmental damage from 9/11 under the Comprehensive Environmental Response, Compensation, and Liability Act of 1980 since the attacks were an act of war.

Thursday, May 15, 2014 
The museum at the National September 11 Memorial at the World Trade Center site, which includes a repository for unidentified remains from the attacks, is inaugurated during a private ceremony with victims' families and friends. The facility is opened to the public six days later.

November

Monday, November 3, 2014 
One World Trade Center formally opens to new tenants with Condé Nast moving in.

December

Thursday, December 4, 2014 
The U.S. Supreme Court rejects Cedar & Washington's appeal in its lawsuit.

2016

March

Thursday, March 3, 2016 
The World Trade Center Transportation Hub opens.

June

Friday, June 10, 2016 
Liberty Park opens at the World Trade Center site.

July

Friday, July 15, 2016 
The U.S. federal government declassifies the redacted "28 pages" of the Joint Inquiry into Intelligence Community Activities before and after the Terrorist Attacks of September 11, 2001 revealing that al-Qaeda was assisted by individuals affiliated with the Saudi government.

September

Sunday, September 11, 2016 
Ceremonies are held across the United States and the world to mark the 15th anniversary of the attacks, including a vigil at the World Trade Center site attended by both major candidates of the 2016 United States presidential election, Donald Trump and Hillary Rodham Clinton.

Wednesday, September 28, 2016 
Congress passes the Justice Against Sponsors of Terrorism Act, overturning President Barack Obama's veto for the only time in his presidency, allowing victims of the September 11 attacks to sue the Government of Saudi Arabia for the attacks.

2018

Monday, June 11, 2018 
The new 3 World Trade Center opens.

Saturday, September 8, 2018 
The WTC Cortlandt station destroyed in the attacks is reopened after reconstruction is completed.

2019

Monday, July 29, 2019 
President Donald Trump signs the Never Forget the Heroes Act permanently authorizing the September 11th Victim Compensation Fund.

Friday, August 30, 2019 
The United States v. Khalid Sheikh Mohammed trial is scheduled for January 11, 2021.

2020

Friday, December 18, 2020 
After being repeatedly delayed because of the COVID-19 pandemic, a judge indefinitely postpones the U.S. vs. KLM trial.

2021

September

Friday, September 10, 2021 
After numerous delays, St. Nicholas Greek Orthodox Church is partially reopened and illuminated for an outdoor memorial service ahead of 20th anniversary commemorations the follow day.

Saturday, September 11, 2021 
Ceremonies are held across the United States and the world to commemorate the 20th anniversary of the attacks. President Joe Biden, First Lady Jill Biden, former presidents Bill Clinton and Barack Obama accompanied with their respective spouses, and several federal, state, local officials attend a remembrance ceremony at the National September 11 Memorial & Museum in New York. Vice President Kamala Harris and former president George W. Bush speak at a memorial service held the Flight 93 National Memorial in Somerset County, Pennsylvania. A vigil was also held at the Pentagon Memorial where both Biden and Harris later visited.

2022

Sunday, July 31, 2022 
The second emir of Al-Qaeda, Ayman al-Zawahiri, who helped plan the September 11 attacks, was killed in a drone strike at his home in Kabul, Afghanistan. President Biden would later announce al-Zawahiri's death in a statement the day after on August 1.

Monday, December 6, 2022 
St. Nicholas Greek Orthodox Church fully opened for regular services on December 6, 2022, the Feast of Saint Nicholas.

2023 
The Ronald O. Perelman Performing Arts Center is scheduled to open at the World Trade Center.

2027 
The new 2 World Trade Center is scheduled to be completed.

2028 
The new 5 World Trade Center is scheduled to be completed.

References

Aftermath of the September 11 attacks
October beyond